Yoro  is a village and commune and seat of the Cercle of Koro in the Mopti Region of Mali. In 1998 the commune had a population of 10,535. The village and Gangafani were attacked by suspected Fulani gunmen, who killed 41 people according to a MINUSMA count.

References

Communes of Mopti Region